Natabari Assembly constituency is an assembly constituency in Cooch Behar district in the Indian state of West Bengal.

Overview
As per orders of the Delimitation Commission, No. 8 Natabari Assembly constituency covers Deoanhat, Dauaguri, Guriahati I, Guriahati II, Jiranpur and Panisala gram panchayats of Cooch Behar I community development block and Andaran Fulbari II, Balarampur I, Balarampur II, Chilkhana I, Chilkhana II, Deocharai, Dhalpal II, Maruganj, Natabari I, Natabari II gram  panchayats of Tufanganj I community development block.

Natabari Assembly constituency is part of No. 1 Cooch Behar (Lok Sabha constituency) (SC).

Members of Legislative Assembly

Election results

2021

2011
In the 2011 election, Rabindra Nath Ghosh of Trinamool Congress defeated his nearest rival Tamser Ali of CPI(M).

1972-2006
Contests in most years were multi cornered but only winners and runners are being mentioned. In the 2006 and 2001 state assembly elections, Tamser Ali of CPI(M) defeated Rabindra Nath Ghosh of Trinamool Congress. Sibendra Narayan Chowdhury of CPI(M) defeated Rabindranath Ghosh representing Congress in 1996, Biimbal Chandra Dhar of Congress in 1991, Santosh Kumar Roy of Congress in 1987, 1982 and 1977. Prior to that the constituency did not exist.

References

Assembly constituencies of West Bengal
Politics of Cooch Behar district